is a three-part original video animation (OVA) based on the popular 1970s anime Science Ninja Team Gatchaman. It was released in Japan and the United States during the mid-1990s. This version of Gatchaman is set in the year 2066 where the evil leader of the nation of Hontwall is threatening to take over the planet. Scientists from the International Science Organization are disappearing and only five teenage heroes, the Science Ninja team, can stop the disaster. The OVAs were licensed by Urban Vision through Harmony Gold USA and were released on VHS and DVD. At Anime Boston 2013, Sentai Filmworks had announced that they have rescued the OVA series along with the original 1970s series for a DVD re-release in October.  The series was made available for streaming through Crunchyroll.

The series was originally dubbed by Harmony Gold and Urban Vision, however, Sentai Filmworks produced a new English dub in 2013 for their DVD and Blu-ray re-release to match the uncut TV series dub.

Plot

Cast
The show has gotten two English releases. Note that some characters not directly credited in one English version or another, but have been deduced from additional voice credits/ prior roles of an actor, are in italics. 

In 1997, Harmony Gold released the series with a dub recorded by co-publisher Urban Vision, with its former in-house dub producer Sky Quest Entertainment. This dub changed a few character names, but kept an overall faithful plot otherwise. This version was released on VHS and DVD, before Harmony Gold's license expired.

In 2013, Sentai Filmworks, licensed and redubbed the series using former ADV Films in-house dub producer Seraphim Digital. This dub keeps the original Japanese names, and uses the cast from Sentai's uncut dub of the original show. Dub director Charles Campbell used the alias names "Bentley Jet" and "Brando Austin" in the credits in addition to his real one.

Major cast

Minor cast

Staff

Extras

Design
In the OVA series, the characters' designs and ages were changed along with other elements as part of the process of "updating" the series for modern audiences. Ken, who had long hair in the original series, was given short hair. Joe was redesigned with more of a "bad boy" image, given a tattoo and made a smoker — His car was also updated to a Shelby Cobra. Jun originally had long green hair but has short brown hair in the OVA, has developed physically and has worked as a model in the past. Jinpei is renamed as Jimmy and given more of a "street kid" look while his position on the team becomes "hacker". Ryu is now the oldest at 25, he was originally 17, and his hairstyle is changed to a blonde and purple mohawk. The GodPhoenix was also redesigned and appears to be larger than the original. The Red Impulse squadron had only three members in the original series while in the OVA continuity there are more.

Music
The film's soundtrack was composed and produced by Maurice White and Bill Meyers, with additional music by Bob Sakuma from the original TV series. The ending theme "Let's Fly" was performed by Lance Matthew.

References

Further reading
G-Force: Animated

External links

Harmony Gold Entertainment Catalog

OVA
1994 anime OVAs
Adventure anime and manga
Cyberpunk anime and manga
Ninja in anime and manga
Sentai Filmworks
Tatsunoko Production
Anime film and television articles using incorrect naming style

ja:科学忍者隊ガッチャマン#OVA.E7.89.88